A thumb compass is a type of compass commonly used in orienteering, a sport in which map reading and terrain association are paramount. In cases of homogeneous terrain with few distinct features, a bearing between 2 known points on the map may be used.  Consequently, most thumb compasses have minimal or no degree markings at all, and are normally used only to take bearings directly from a map, and to orient a map to magnetic north. Thumb compasses are also often transparent so that an orienteer can hold a map in the hand with the compass and see the map through the compass.

Thumb compasses attach to one's thumb using a small elastic band. 

The first commercially successful orienteering thumb compass was the Norcompass, introduced by Suunto in 1983.

Placing an even greater emphasis on speed over accuracy, the wrist compass lacks even a baseplate, consisting solely of a needle capsule strapped to the carpometacarpal joint at the base of the thumb; the thumb serves the function of a baseplate when taking and sighting bearings.  It is often used for city and park race orienteering.

See also
Protractor compass
Hand compass

References

External links
Silva 6 Jet Spectra, a typical modern thumb compass
The Internet Compass Museum gives comprehensive information about all sorts of compasses and how to use them.

Orienteering
Sports equipment